Yankeetown is an unincorporated community in Foster Township, Big Stone County, Minnesota, United States.

Notes

Unincorporated communities in Big Stone County, Minnesota
Unincorporated communities in Minnesota